MS Stena Adventurer may refer to the following ships operated by Stena Line:

, a ferry built in 1977 for Sealink UK as MS St. Columba. No longer a part of the Stena Line Fleet.
, a ferry currently operated by Stena Line between Holyhead and Dublin.

Ship names